The Calgary Challenger, currently sponsored as Calgary National Bank Challenger, is a professional tennis tournament played on indoor hard courts. It is currently part of the ATP Challenger Tour and the ITF Women's World Tennis Tour. The first edition was held in Calgary, Alberta, Canada in October 2018.

Past finals

Men's singles

Women's singles

Men's doubles

Women's doubles

References

External links
Official website

 
ATP Challenger Tour
ITF Women's World Tennis Tour
Tennis tournaments in Canada
Hard court tennis tournaments
Sports competitions in Calgary
Tennis in Alberta
Recurring sporting events established in 2018
2018 establishments in Alberta